John C. Crockett (born February 16, 1992) is a gridiron football running back who is a free agent. He played college football at North Dakota State. Crockett was signed by the Green Bay Packers as an undrafted free agent in 2015.

College career
Crockett attended North Dakota State University, where he played on the North Dakota State Bison football team from 2012 to 2014.

Statistics

Professional career

Green Bay Packers
After going undrafted in the 2015 NFL Draft, Crockett signed with the Green Bay Packers on May 8, 2015. On September 5, 2015, he was released by the Packers during final team cuts. Crockett was signed to the Packers' practice squad on September 7, 2015. On December 3, 2015, he was promoted from the practice squad to the active roster. Crockett made his NFL debut against the Detroit Lions in Week 13.  He finished the game with 5 rushes for 22 yards in the Packers' 27–23 miracle victory in Detroit. Crockett saw his first playoff action on January 10, 2016 in the Packers' wildcard playoff game against the Washington Redskins, playing on special teams.

On August 30, 2016, Crockett was placed on injured reserve.

Oakland Raiders
Crockett was signed by the Oakland Raiders on July 14, 2017. He was waived by the team on September 2, 2017.

Baltimore Ravens
On September 21, 2017, Crockett was signed to the Baltimore Ravens' practice squad. He signed a reserve/future contract with the Ravens on January 1, 2018. He was released on May 2, 2018.

Arizona Hotshots
Crockett signed with the Arizona Hotshots of the Alliance of American Football for the 2019 season, but was placed on injured reserve before the start of the season on January 30, 2019. He was waived from injured reserve on February 22, 2019.

Ottawa Redblacks
Crockett was released by the Ottawa Redblacks on February 5, 2021.

NFL career statistics

References

External links
Oakland Raiders bio
Green Bay Packers bio
North Dakota State Bison bio

1992 births
Living people
Players of American football from Minneapolis
American football running backs
North Dakota State Bison football players
Green Bay Packers players
Oakland Raiders players
Baltimore Ravens players
Arizona Hotshots players
Ottawa Redblacks players
Canadian football running backs
American players of Canadian football
Players of Canadian football from Minnesota